Bierge is a municipality located in the province of Huesca, Aragon, Spain. According to the 2010 census (INE), the municipality has a population of 258 inhabitants.

Geography 
Bierge is at 600 meters on the sea, and it has the following villages:
 Las Almunias de Rodellar, Letosa, Morrano, Nasarre (deserted), Otín (deserted), Pedruel, Rodellar, San Hipólito, San Román, San Saturnino and Yaso.

In the mountain, near Nasarre and Otín, is the Dolmen Losa de la Mora.

Cultural depictions
Crucial scenes of the film The Invisible Guest take place in Bierge.

References

Municipalities in the Province of Huesca